Dunolly is a closed railway station on the Mildura line in the town of Dunolly, Victoria, Australia. The station was one of 35 closed to passenger traffic on 4 October 1981 as part of the New Deal timetable for country passengers. Today it is the junction for the lines towards Inglewood, Kulwin, and Robinvale. It also contains grain silos.

The railway from Castlemaine, via Maryborough, reached Dunolly on 6 October 1874. A connection between Maryborough and Ballarat was made on 2 February 1875.

References

External links
 Melway map at street-directory.com.au

Disused railway stations in Victoria (Australia)